Victor Nekesa is a Ugandan physician, military officer and legislator. She represents the Uganda People's Defense Forces (UPDF) in the parliament of Uganda.

Background and education 
Nekesa is a medical doctor by profession. She is also Uganda People's Defense forces (UPDF) officer at the rank of colonel.

She was voted into parliament alongside two other female UPDF officers including Charity Bainababo and Jennifer Alanyo by the defence council. Nekasa got the highest number of votes in the females category.

The defence council also nominated and voted seven men to represent the country's military in the parliament of Uganda.

Career 
Nekesa is a professional soldier and medical doctor. She is a personal physician of Yoweri Kaguta Museveni president of the republic of Uganda.

In parliament, Nekesa serves as a member of the health committee.

References 

Members of the Parliament of Uganda
Women members of the Parliament of Uganda
21st-century Ugandan politicians
21st-century Ugandan women politicians

Year of birth missing (living people)
Living people
Ugandan physicians